Raja Sir Maharaj Singh  (17 May 1878, Kapurthala, Punjab – 6 June 1959, Lucknow) was the first Indian Governor of Bombay. He was also the Prime Minister of Jammu and Kashmir during Maharaja Hari Singh's rule and also the Dewan of Jodhpur for a short while.

Life
Maharaj Singh was the son of Raja Harnam Singh of the Kapurthala royal family in the direct line founded by Jassa Singh Ahluwalia.  His mother was Rani Priscilla Kaur Sahiba (née Priscilla Golaknath). He was educated at Harrow School and Balliol College, Oxford, where he completed his MA, and was called to Bar by the Middle Temple in 1902. Starting off as the Deputy Collector of United Provinces, he held several positions in the government of India. He was elected the chancellor of Lucknow University in 1941 and served for a short span as the Prime Minister of Kashmir. He was the Governor of Bombay from 1948 to 1952. He was appointed a CIE in 1915 and knighted in 1933. 

At the age of 72, he captained the Bombay Governor's XI against a touring Commonwealth XI in a cricket match starting on 25 November 1950. This makes him the oldest cricketer to make his first-class debut and the oldest player to play a first-class game. Coming in to bat at No. 9, he edged Jim Laker for 3 and one run later, was caught at first slip off the same bowler. He took no part in the game after the first day and Yadavindra Singh of Patiala captained the side in his absence. Laker was 44 years younger than the man he dismissed. The Test cricketer Rusi Modi served as his ADC while he was the Bombay governor.

Rajkumari Bibiji Amrit Kaur, who was the Minister of Health in the Nehru government, was his younger sister. Married to Gunwati Maya Das of Ferozepore, Maharaj Singh had two sons, Raja Ranbir Singh, a diplomat (died June 1995) and Kanwar Mahindar Singh a tennis player and businessman based in Chandigarh (died August 2004), as well as one daughter, Prem Maharaj Seth (née Singh) (died September 2019).

Titles
1878-1915: Kanwar Maharaj Singh
1915-1932: Kanwar Maharaj Singh, CIE
1932-1933: Raja Maharaj Singh, CIE
1933-1937: Raja Sir Maharaj Singh, CIE
1937-1959: Raja Sir Maharaj Singh, CIE, CStJ
1948-1952: His Excellency Sri Sir Maharaj Singh, CIE, CStJ, Governor of the State of Bombay

Honours

(ribbon bar, as it would look today)

Companion of the Order of the Indian Empire (CIE)-1915
Knight Bachelor-1933
King George V Silver Jubilee Medal-1935
Commander of the Order of St John (CStJ)-1937
King George VI Coronation Medal-1937
Indian Independence Medal-1948

References

External links
 Times Obituary, 8 June 1959
  Indian Princely States - Kapurthala
 Martin Williamson, Ripe old age

1878 births
1959 deaths
People educated at Harrow School
Alumni of Balliol College, Oxford
Members of the Middle Temple
Indian cricketers
Knights Bachelor
Companions of the Order of the Indian Empire
Indian Knights Bachelor
Indian diplomats
Punjabi people
Cricketers from Punjab, India
Commanders of the Order of St John
Governors of Bombay
Politicians from British India